Owen Joshua Lewsey MBE (born 30 November 1976) is an English former rugby union player who represented England and the British and Irish Lions. Lewsey is a former British Army Officer.

Background and early life
Lewsey was born in Bromley, London to Welsh parents, but spent most of his childhood in the Hertfordshire village of Sarratt and spent his early years at Sarratt Church of England primary school. He subsequently attended Watford Grammar School for Boys and then attended the University of Bristol on a British Army bursary, graduating in 1998, and lived in the same hall of residence as three-time Olympian sailor Iain Percy; he was able to graduate after obtaining special permission to take his final exams in Australia as he had been selected for England's 1998 "Tour of Hell" in the Southern Hemisphere. In 2009 he was awarded a Doctor of Laws (LL.D) honoris causa by the university.

Military
Lewsey graduated from the Royal Military Academy Sandhurst in 2001 and was commissioned as a troop commander into the Royal Artillery. However, after two years of combining the Army and a professional rugby career, he found that doing both became impossible, and he resigned his commission.

Rugby career
While at school he played for the Amersham and Chiltern Rugby Football Club and also Fullerians RFC as a pupil of Watford Grammar Boys’ Grammar School. He first played for Wasps at eighteen in their Colts side, before being selected for their senior team. In that season he made his first appearance for England, in the U19s against Italy.

During his time at university, Lewsey combined his studies with playing professionally for Bristol RFC. He then rejoined London Wasps at the age of twenty one after completing his degree. He won his first full England caps in 1998 against New Zealand and then South Africa.

In the following years, he was a member of the successful Wasps side that won 12 trophies, starting with the Tetley's Bitter Cup in 1999, in the final of which he scored a try. The following year Wasps retained the cup, and in the 2000 final he again scored a try this time against Northampton, having spent the morning at Sandhurst with his platoon on routine room inspection, block cleaning and parade drill.

Amongst his 12 trophies at Wasps were four Premiership titles in 2003, 2004, 2005 and 2008. Lewsey played in all four finals, and scored two tries in the 2003 final and one in the 2008 final. He also played in the victorious 2004 and 2007 Heineken Cup finals.

After a good run of form with the national team, he scored 11 tries at the 2007 Middlesex 7s to help Wasps win their first Middlesex 7s title since 1993. He became the tournament's top try and points scorer.

On 5 April 2009, Lewsey announced that he would retire from Rugby at the end of the 2008/09 season. That year with Wasps he won Player of the Year, but was not selected for the 2009 British & Irish Lions team for the tour to South Africa.

International
Lewsey appeared for England in all three tests in the 2001 North American tour, and was a member of the England side that won the Hong Kong Sevens in 2002. He also represented England in sevens at the 2002 Commonwealth Games, opting to play in the tournament over touring Argentina with the National team.

Lewsey made his England home debut in the Six Nations Championship in 2003 after an injury to Jason Robinson. He scored twice in a 40–5 win over Italy. He followed this with the opening try in his next game against Scotland, and was part of the Grand Slam winning side. He had a key part in the tests against New Zealand and Australia on the June 2003 Southern-hemisphere tour. By then he was first-choice full-back, Jason Robinson having moved to wing.  He was a part of the 2003 World Cup winning squad, and scored five tries in the 111–13 defeat of Uruguay.

He was selected for the 2005 British & Irish Lions tour to New Zealand. He made an ideal start scoring two tries in the first five minutes against Bay of Plenty. Lewsey was widely viewed as a standout player for the Lions, despite the team's poor results. Lewsey continued to be an integral part of the England team at the 2006 Six Nations.

Lewsey featured heavily in England's campaign to retain the Rugby World Cup in 2007, playing in every game en route to the final. He scored the only try against France in the 14–9 victory which put England into the last two. However, just before half-time in the same match he picked up a hamstring injury which ruled him out of the final. That semi final was to be his last game for England.

England's coach Brian Ashton did not select Lewsey for the England squad to compete in the 2008 Six Nations squad. However, he was called up for Martin Johnson's England Squad for 2008/2009, but was not selected to play.

On 10 December 2008 Lewsey announced his retirement from international rugby to concentrate on his club career, ending his time in the England set-up, which spanned more than 10 years and claiming 55 caps with 22 tries scored.

Due to his parentage Lewsey also qualified to play for Wales but chose to represent England as he had received a call-up from them first. His mother is from the Swansea Valley area while his father is half Welsh.

Post playing career

Lewsey pursued interests outside rugby. In 2005 he completed his Postgraduate diploma in Law. He also set up a leadership development and business consultancy, which looked to apply organisational performance lessons from sport and the military, into business.

Lewsey released his autobiography on 5 February 2009 titled One Chance: My Life and Rugby.

In 2009 he joined PwC as a management consultant.

In September 2011, Lewsey joined Citigroup Global Markets Ltd. as an equities sales trader. After a year in the role he undertook a review of the division's structural trading model, and was subsequently offered the role of Head of Business Advisory Services, EMEA.

In 2017, Lewsey joined Ernst & Young as People Advisory Services Leader in Asia-Pacific. However, he struggled to find new businesses at EY and moved multiple teams, eventually leaving in 2021.

In 2021 he established Teneo Value+ as CEO, following his departure from EY.

Rugby administrator
In March 2013 having spent several years outside the world of sport, he took up a six-month position as Interim CEO at the Cornish Pirates. During his time there, Lewsey pressed the need for the club to "represent its community" and "harness the power of the identity of Cornwall".

On 30 August 2013, Lewsey was appointed Head of Rugby at the Welsh Rugby Union. After a comprehensive review, Lewsey embarked on a new strategy for the organisation of which a key initiative was support for the grassroots game, establishing School-Club Hubs to safeguard the future of rugby in Wales. By September 2014, the WRU had 43 schools participating in the scheme. By the second year it had increased to 93, which equated to most secondary schools in Wales. He resigned in November 2015, citing personal reasons which would prevent him from dedicating himself to the position full-time.

Other interests

As an avid climber, in 2006 Lewsey was given the summer off from international rugby and spent time climbing in the Himalayas reaching the base camp of K2. He did not inform his club of the expedition as he was sure they would object.

In 2010 Lewsey and his friend Keith Reesby were unsuccessful in their attempt to climb to the summit of Mount Everest via the difficult North Col route. Both climbers were within 500 feet of the summit when breathing apparatus failure caused them to abandon the ascent. Lewsey admitted afterwards that he had "never felt so scared" as the two climbers attempted to descend from over 8500m without supplementary oxygen.

References

External links 
 Profile & Statistics on ESPNscrum
 Wasps profile
 Josh Lewsey interview at Southwesttrains.co.uk
 Sporting Heroes 12

1976 births
Living people
Alumni of the University of Bristol
Bristol Bears players
British & Irish Lions rugby union players from England
English people of Welsh descent
English rugby union players
England international rugby union players
Graduates of the Royal Military Academy Sandhurst
Wasps RFC players
Members of the Order of the British Empire
People educated at Watford Grammar School for Boys
Rugby union players from Bromley
Royal Artillery officers
Rugby union fullbacks
Rugby union wings